The Liberty Lifter is a concept from the U.S. military's Defense Advanced Research Projects Agency (DARPA) launched in mid-2022 to develop a long-range, low-cost transport using the idea of a maritime ground-effect vehicle not unlike the Soviet KM ekranoplan.

History
DARPA launched the project in mid-2022, wanting a plane that could combine lift of large, heavy loads by skimming the water in ground effect, but also capable of operating at mid-altitudes of up to 10,000 feet. Such a vehicle would also be able to land and take off from the water, making it runway-independent.

In February 2023, DARPA awarded contracts to two contractors to develop their own plans. One is General Atomics Aeronautical Systems (GA-ASI), partnering with Maritime Applied Physics Corporation; their design features a twin hull and a mid-wing, powered by twelve turboshaft engines. The other participant is Boeing subsidiary Aurora Flight Sciences partnering with Leidos subsidiary Gibbs & Cox and with ReconCraft; their design is a monohull with a high-wing, primarily relying on eight turbine engines.

The initial Phase 1 GA-ASI group contract is for $8 million for the next six months, with an option for another 12 months potentially growing to a total of $29 million.

Specifications for the craft include the ability to fly less than 100 feet from sea level to harness ground effect, but also the ability to climb as high as 10,000 feet above mean sea level. It should have a ferry range of 6,500 nm, and be able to take off and land in sea state 4, but sustain on-water operations up to sea state 5. And, it should meet the United States Department of Defense heavy lift requirements of 100+ tons. Such a craft would be similar in size and capacity to the Boeing C-17 Globemaster III. DARPA is hoping for all of this with a low-cost design and construction philosophy.

Final designs for Phase 1 are expected by mid-2024. The winning design will proceed to Phase 2, which includes further design, and the building and testing of a full-size prototype, which will then continue to flight-testing within roughly five years.

References

Aircraft manufactured in the United States
Ground effect vehicles
Ekranoplans
Flying boats
DARPA
Research projects